Zungaro is a genus of long-whiskered catfishes native to South America, with two recognized species :
  (H. von Ihering, 1898)
 Zungaro zungaro (Humboldt, 1821) (gilded catfish)

References

Pimelodidae
Freshwater fish genera
Catfish genera
Catfish of South America
Freshwater fish of South America
Fish described in 1858
Taxa named by Pieter Bleeker